Frédéric Marcelin (1848–1917) was a Haitian writer and politician. Born in Port-au-Prince, Marcelin was best known for the three novels Marilisse (1903), La Vengeance de Mama (1902), and Thémistocle Epaminondas Labasterre (1901). Along with his contemporaries Fernand Hibbert and Justin Lhérisson he worked to establish a uniquely Haitian novel.

He also wrote an essay on the National Bank of Haiti, Haïti et sa Banque Nationale (1896), and another on the "Finance and Commerce Department", (Le Départment des Finances et du Commerce d'Haïti) (1896).

He was Minister of Finance 1892-1895 and 1905-1908.

References

 

1848 births
1917 deaths
20th-century Haitian novelists
Foreign Ministers of Haiti
Finance ministers of Haiti
Haitian male novelists
Haitian politicians
People from Port-au-Prince
20th-century male writers